New Rules is an English-Irish pop boy band that formed in 2019. The group is composed of vocalists Alec McGarry, Nathan Lambert and bassist and vocalist Ryan Meaney. In 2019, they released their debut EP New Rules through AMLOR Music.

Career 

Vocalists Alec McGarry, Ryan Meaney and Nathan Lambert came together in early 2019 and formed a band called New Rules. They released a promotional single titled 'Call It' in May 2019. After months of songwriting and recording, they released their debut single 'Fix Somebody' on 7 June 2019. It was featured during the fifth season of the Irish television series Love Island. As this single became successful, they released the official video for Fix Somebody on 26 June 2019. Shortly afterwards, their second single, 'Mountains' was released in July 2019. In October 2019, British girl-group Little Mix announced the group to be the opening acts on their UK & Ireland shows of LM5: The Tour. After the tour, they released a new single titled '24 Hours' with a music video also being released. It was then announced this was their debut single from their upcoming self-titled EP, 'New Rules'. In December 2019, they released their 4 track EP and it was made available for digital download and streaming. The second single from the EP, 'Happy Ever After You' was released in December 2019. 

The band announced their debut headlining tour in 2020, playing venues across the UK & Ireland in Spring 2020, with all the shows selling out. Soon after, they were announced as opening acts for Irish band Picture This' upcoming summer tour. Some of the dates of the 2020 Spring Tour were rescheduled to Summer 2021 due to the COVID-19 pandemic. They released a non-album single 'Pasta' and a promotional single called 'Look What We've Done' in April 2020. In May 2020, the band announced they were due to release a brand new single called 'Emily' but it was postponed due to the ongoing Black Lives Matter protests. Instead, they decided to release a demo of a song that was only heard on early promotional tours called 'Problem', which was only available to fans who donated to Black Lives Matter charities. Their single 'Emily' was  released on 2 July 2020.

After more than one year without releasing music, they started to tease an upcoming single in their TikTok videos (fans started to recognize a pattern in their Turning Your Names Into Songs video series, as their three last videos ended with the lyrics "really wanna, really wanna, really wanna dance with you"). On September 22, 2021, they posted a short teaser video on their social media and captioned it "we really wanna, really wanna, really wanna... share some news. TOMORROW". On September 23, 2021, they announced the news of signing to Elektra Records, and later announced that their title of their latest single is called "Really Wanna Dance With You", which was released on October 1, 2021.

Discography

Mixtapes

Extended plays

Singles

Tours 
Headlining
New Rules 2019 Tour (2019)
New Rules 2020 Tour (2020)
Supporting
Little Mix - LM5: The Tour (2019)
Julia Michaels - The Inner Monologue Tour (2019)

References 

British boy bands
Musical groups established in 2019
British pop music groups
Elektra Records artists